Short Sharp Shock (also known as SSS) are an English crossover thrash band from Liverpool, England. They are signed to the music label Prosthetic Records.

The band formed and featured members of Liverpool punk and hardcore bands Down and Outs and Walk the Plank and released a six track demo in May 2005, a four track EP the next year and their debut album Short Sharp Shock soon thereafter. Their label at the time was Thrashgig / Dead & Gone Records. Their switch to Earache Records meant the album was re-issued in early 2007 with bonus tracks.

In 2008, they released their second album, The Dividing Line, again on Earache Records. This also came with a free Sk8+Destroy 7" record, featuring British comedian Frank Sidebottom.

In June 2011, they released their third album, Problems to the Answer, on Earache Records. Upping the track count to 25 with Mark "Barney" Greenway from Napalm Death on guest vocals. Original founding members David Fergusson and guitarist Peter Broom decided to leave the band at this point. July 2011, a line-up change occurred when Stu and El Longo joined.

In November 2013, the band signed with Prosthetic Records, and released the Manipulated Living EP. SSS's fourth album entitled LIMP.GASP.COLLAPSE. was released in November 2014 on Prosthetic Records and featured Jeff Walker from Carcass on guest vocals.

Members
 Foxy – Vocals
 Stu – Guitar
 El Longo – Drums
 Mr Bass man – Bass

Discography
SSS (2005), Thrashgig, – Demo
SSS (2006), Thrashgig, Dead and Gone – EP
Short Sharp Shock (2006), Earache – Studio album
Sk8 + Destroy 7" (2008), Earache – EP
The Dividing Line (2009), Earache – Album
Merry ChristmaSSS (2009), Earache – Free Download
Live in Liverpool (2010), Earache – EP
Problems to the Answer (2011), Earache – Studio album
Manipulated Living (demo) (2013)
Manipulated Living (EP) (2013), Prosthetic – EP
LIMP.GASP.COLLAPSE. (2014), Prosthetic – Studio album

Contributed tracks to
Thrashing Like a Maniac (Compilation, 2007)

External links
Homepage
Last.fm page
SSS interview on Rockmidgets.com
Review of Feb 2008 Manchester Academy 2 gig

Musical groups established in 2005
English thrash metal musical groups
Earache Records artists
Crossover thrash groups